Bulkington Pass is a pass on the south side of Flask Glacier and west of Bildad Peak in Voden Heights on the east side of Graham Land. The toponym is one in a group applied by the UK Antarctic Place-Names Committee that reflects a whaling theme, Bulkington being a crewman on the vessel Pequod in Herman Melville's Moby Dick.

References 

Mountain passes of Graham Land
Oscar II Coast
Moby-Dick